Nicolas Martinetti (born January 1, 1989 in Ajaccio) is a French professional football player who currently plays for FC Aregno Calvi.

Career
He played on the professional level in Ligue 2 for SC Bastia. He played the 2009/2010 season in the Championnat de France amateur for Gazélec Ajaccio, before in July 2010 signed for FC Aregno Calvi.

Notes

1989 births
Living people
French footballers
Ligue 2 players
SC Bastia players
FCA Calvi players
Corsica international footballers
Association football midfielders
Footballers from Corsica